Angelos Ioannou (born ) is a Cypriot male weightlifter, competing in the 105 kg category and representing Cyprus at international competitions. He competed at world championships, most recently at the 2002 World Weightlifting Championships.

Major results

References

1972 births
Living people
Cypriot male weightlifters
Place of birth missing (living people)